goosefoot (stylized as goosefoot®) is an American restaurant located in Chicago. An adjacent grocery, called goosefoot food & wine, opened in 2014. The food and wine store added an ice cream shop in late 2017.

The restaurant is BYOB.

See also
 List of Michelin starred restaurants in Chicago

References

External links
 Goosefoot website

Restaurants established in 2011
Restaurants in Chicago
2011 establishments in Illinois
Michelin Guide starred restaurants in Illinois